Patrizio Lunato Laosio (died 22 April 1602) was a Roman Catholic prelate who served as Bishop of Nusco (1578–1602).

Biography
On 15 Oct 1578, Patrizio Lunato Laosio was appointed by Pope Gregory XIII as Bishop of Nusco.
He served as Bishop of Nusco until his death on 22 April 1602.

References

External links and additional sources
 (for Chronology of Bishops) 
 (for Chronology of Bishops) 

16th-century Italian Roman Catholic bishops
1602 deaths
Bishops appointed by Pope Gregory XIII